Phillip Geoffrey Targett-Adams (born 31 January 1951), known professionally as Phil Manzanera, is an English guitarist, songwriter and record producer. He is the lead guitarist with Roxy Music, and was the lead guitarist with 801, and Quiet Sun. In 2006, Manzanera co-produced David Gilmour's album On an Island, and played in Gilmour's band for tours in Europe and North America. He wrote and presented a series of 14 one-hour radio programmes for station Planet Rock entitled The A-Z of Great Guitarists.

Early life
Manzanera was born on 31 January 1951 in London, England, to a Colombian mother (nee Manzanera) and an English father, who worked for British Overseas Airways Corporation, and spent most of his childhood in different parts of the Americas, including Hawaii, Venezuela, Colombia, and Cuba. It was in Havana, Cuba, living opposite Batista that the young Manzanera, aged six, encountered his first guitar, a Spanish guitar owned by his mother. His earliest musical accomplishments were Cuban folk songs inspired by the Cuban Revolution.

In Venezuela, the eight-year-old Manzanera started experimenting with the sounds of the electric guitar. During his teenage years he was absorbing the twin influences of 1960s rock and roll and Latin American rhythms of merengue, cumbia, and particularly the boleros of the Mexican Armando Manzanero.

In his late teens Manzanera – then a boarder at Dulwich College in south east London, England, where his brother was also a student – formed a series of school bands with his friends Bill MacCormick, later a member of Matching Mole and Random Hold, MacCormick's brother Ian (better known as music writer Ian MacDonald) and drummer Charles Hayward, later of This Heat and Camberwell Now. Among the younger students at the school who saw the older boys performing in these various bands were Simon Ainley (later in 801), David Ferguson and David Rhodes; Ainley was briefly the lead vocalist for 801 in 1977, and all three were members of the late-1970s progressive group Random Hold; Rhodes subsequently became a long-serving member of Peter Gabriel's backing band.

The final incarnation of Manzanera's Dulwich College bands – a psychedelic outfit dubbed Pooh & the Ostrich Feathers – evolved into the progressive rock quartet Quiet Sun with the addition of keyboard player Dave Jarrett. They wrote a number of original songs and instrumental pieces, none of which were recorded until years later, and the band broke up when McCormick joined Matching Mole, but Manzanera briefly revived the group in 1975 to record a full LP of their original music during the making of his first solo album Diamond Head; later he included two other previously unrecorded Quiet Sun tracks on his 2008 album Firebird V11, which also featured Charles Hayward.

Music career

Roxy Music (1971–1983) 

Manzanera was determined to join a professional band, and in October 1971 he was one of about twenty players who auditioned as lead guitarist for the recently formed art rock band Roxy Music. Manzanera displayed a wide-ranging interest in music. Influenced by his childhood sojourns in Latin America, and his stints at boarding school, he came to know several prominent musicians including Soft Machine's Robert Wyatt and Pink Floyd's David Gilmour, who was a friend of his older brother, Eugene.

He joined Roxy Music in 1972; his bandmates at this time were Bryan Ferry, Brian Eno, Paul Thompson, Andy Mackay, and Graham Simpson. Roxy Music's rise was meteoric, with the band being hailed as a major stylistic influence of the early 1970s. During the next 12 years, until 1983 when the band members went on a "long break", Roxy Music released a series of internationally best-selling albums, achieving ten UK Top Ten albums and touring extensively throughout the world. Although Ferry had sole writing credit on the first two LPs, and his work dominated the group's output, Manzanera was credited as co-writer with Ferry on the following Roxy Music songs:

 "Amazona" (Stranded, 1973)
 "Out of the Blue" and "Prairie Rose" (Country Life, 1974)
 "Whirlwind" and "Nightingale" (Siren, 1975),
 "Manifesto", "Still Falls The Rain", "Trash" and "My Little Girl" (Manifesto, 1979)
 "Trash 2" ("Trash" single B-side, 1979)
 "Over You", "No Strange Delight" and "Running Wild" (Flesh & Blood, 1980)
 "Lover" ("Same Old Scene" single B-side, 1980)
 "Take a Chance with Me" (Avalon, 1982)

Manzanera also received sole composer credit on the following Roxy Music song:
 "Hula Kula" ("Street Life" single B-side, 1973)

In parallel with Roxy Music, Manzanera has always pursued solo projects, both recording his own albums and producing for others. His first major credit as producer was in 1975; after spotting the New Zealand group Split Enz, who had supported Roxy on their 1974 Australian tour, Manzanera produced the group's second LP, Second Thoughts, which was recorded in London.

Manzanera played guitar on three tracks of the first Brian Eno album Here Come the Warm Jets, as well as guitar and production assistance on Eno's second solo album Taking Tiger Mountain (By Strategy).

All his previous solo albums have been digitally remastered and re-released with new artwork on his own label, Expression Records.

Solo work and collaborations (1975–2001) 
As a writer, producer and solo artist, Phil Manzanera has worked with many of the luminaries of modern music, such as Steve Winwood, David Gilmour, John Cale, Godley & Creme, Nico and John Wetton. He has co-written material with many artists, including Brian Eno, Tim Finn, Robert Wyatt and Gilmour.  Manzanera co-wrote Pink Floyd's single "One Slip" from their 1987 A Momentary Lapse of Reason album.

Manzanera's first solo album Diamond Head (1975) featured an all-star line-up of session contributors, including most of the former and current members of Roxy Music, except Bryan Ferry. Brian Eno co-wrote and sang on two tracks ("Big Day" and "Miss Shapiro"), Paul Thompson, Eddie Jobson and Andy Mackay all contributed, and Roxy's occasional tour bassist John Wetton (ex Family, and then a member of King Crimson) played bass and duetted on vocals (with Doreen Chanter on "Same Time Next Week"). Robert Wyatt co-wrote and sang (in Spanish) on "Frontera", and the members of Manzanera's pre-Roxy group Quiet Sun featured on the instrumental tracks. Concurrent with the recording of Diamond Head, Manzanera reunited Quiet Sun (who had not been able to make any professional recordings) and used the studio time to quickly record a full LP of Quiet Sun material, released by EG Records under the title Mainstream.

Reworked versions of two tracks from Mainstream featured on Manzanera's next major collaboration, the critically acclaimed concert recording 801 Live, which was recorded at a 1976 London show performed by the "special occasion" band 801. The group comprised Manzanera, with Eno on vocals, synth and treatments, Quiet Sun bassist Bill MacCormick, Curved Air keyboardist Francis Monkman, 19-year-old drumming prodigy Simon Phillips, and slide guitarist Lloyd Watson, who had previously performed as a solo support act for Roxy Music. The LP featured an eclectic mix of Manzanera, Quiet Sun and Eno originals, alongside distinctive cover versions of two well-known tracks, The Beatles' "Tomorrow Never Knows" and The Kinks' "You Really Got Me". The album also broke new ground in live concert recording, being one of the first live LPs to use the "direct injection" (DI) method of recording, in which the signals from the various electric instruments were fed directly into the recording console, enabling a dramatic improvement in fidelity over the earlier method of placing microphones near the various instrument amplifiers.

The success of the live album led to the creation of a more permanent incarnation of 801, without Lloyd Watson. Manzanera's old schoolmate Simon Ainley (who was later a member of Random Hold with Bill McCormick) took over from Eno as lead vocalist, who only provided treatments and textures. Francis Monkman, Bill and Ian McCormick and Simon Phillips became part of an all-star session group that also included Tim Finn and Eddie Rayner of Split Enz (who had by then relocated to the UK), former 10cc members Kevin Godley and Lol Creme, saxophonist Mel Collins, Roxy Music's Eddie Jobson and drummer Dave Mattacks. The 'new' 801 recorded the studio album Listen Now, was released in November 1976, although according to Ainley the initial recordings had begun in December 1975, well before the original concert line-up of 801 was put together. The studio LP was not a commercial success and the group disbanded after a short UK tour. A live performance at Manchester University in Nov. 1977, with Ainley on vocals and guitar, and appearances by special guests Andy Mackay, Kevin Godley and Lol Creme, was recorded on 24-track tape, but the recording remained unreleased until 1997.

Manzanera's second solo album K-Scope (1978) was originally intended to be the second 801 studio album, and indeed it featured many of the same personnel from Listen Now, including Ainley, Bill and Ian McCormick, John Wetton, Simon Phillips, Mel Collins, Tim and Neil Finn, Eddie Rayner, Godley and Creme, and keyboard player Dave Skinner. According to Ainley, he was slated to perform the lead vocal tracks, and he contributed to the composition of the track "Slow Motion TV", but by his own account he had a severe cold the day he began recording his vocals and could not hit the notes; as a result Manzanera replaced him with Tim Finn, and Ainley contributed only rhythm guitar to a couple of tracks. The LP was eventually released under Manzanera's name, but shortly after it was released Roxy Music reformed, and Manzanera's solo projects were put on hold until the group disbanded again in 1982.

His third solo album Primitive Guitars (1982) marked his tenth anniversary as a professional musician. It was intended as a retrospective of his musical influences and stylistic growth, interpreted through a series of solo pieces that represent various stages in his life – childhood in South America, adolescence in London, his work in Roxy Music and 801, and other projects. Manzanera plays all the instruments, backed only by a drum machine, except for one track that features John Wetton on bass. In between tracks, Manzanera inserted snatches of dialogue recorded at various rehearsals.

In the 1990s, Manzanera performed in concerts all over the world, including at Guitar Legends, the five-day guitar festival in Seville, where he was musical director for the event as well as playing with Bob Dylan, Keith Richards, Jack Bruce, Vicente Amigo, Dave Edmunds, Joe Satriani, Steve Cropper, Aterciopelados, Robert Cray and Richard Thompson. He has also played in Mexico, Argentina, Colombia, Cuba, Spain, France, Italy and the UK, including a ten-date European tour with the Cuban band Grupo Moncada. He played at WOMAD festivals in South Africa, Australia and New Zealand. Manzanera ended the 20th Century by appearing with Bryan Ferry at the British Gas Millennium Concert at Greenwich, the first time they had performed together in 18 years. Manzanera produced in 1993 the highly acclaimed album Severino from the Brazilian rock band Os Paralamas do Sucesso, which included a participation by Brian May.

Firebird V11 (2008) was another all-instrumental album, recorded with a 3-piece backing group that included his old Quiet Sun bandmate Charles Hayward on drums, Polish jazz pianist Leszek Możdżer and bassist Yaron Stavi from the Gilad Atzmon band. It includes two original Quiet Sun tracks, written in 1970, which had never been previously recorded. As the title indicates, the album is a tribute to, and feature for, Manzanera's signature guitar, the red-and-black Gibson Firebird V11 guitar which he has played throughout his career  – he can be seen holding the guitar in the "centrefold" photograph on Roxy Music's second album For Your Pleasure in 1972, and a photographically distorted image of it was used on the cover of Primitive Guitars.

Roxy Music reunion and later work (2001–present) 

The Roxy Music "long break" came to an end in 2001 with a critically acclaimed, sold-out, 52-date world tour. In the summer of 2003 Roxy played 10 dates in the US, followed by 13 European gigs in 2004, including performing at Live 8 in Berlin.

Manzanera had a state-of-the-art studio, Gallery Studios, in West London (now Songphonic Records). The first recording was Robert Wyatt's album Cuckooland and the client list included Brian Eno, David Gilmour, Annie Lennox, Kevin Ayers, and Chrissie Hynde. Wyatt's critically acclaimed album Comicopera was recorded at Gallery in 2007.

Manzanera began singing on his own albums with Vozero in 2001, followed by 6pm in 2004 and 50 Minutes Later in 2005.
He appeared at The Strat Pack celebration concert at Wembley Arena in 2005, alongside other musicians such as Hank Marvin, Ronnie Wood and David Gilmour.

He also collaborated with Eno and David Byrne on 2008's Everything That Happens Will Happen Today.

Between 2003 and 2008, he collaborated with Colombian artist/sculptor Lucho Brieva on the Corroncho project. The project sprang from a Spanish version of the track Complicada, written by Brieva's wife Chrissie Hynde. The resulting album comprises a set of songs about two corroncho characters ("corroncho" being the pejorative name given by people from Bogotá to fellow Colombians from the Caribbean Coast, particularly Barranquilla). The album includes the musical styles of salsa, cumbia, pop music, ballads and chillout and has guest appearances from Robert Wyatt, Paul Thompson, Enrique Bunbury, Chrissie Hynde, Annie Lennox, Quimi Portet, Gilad Atzmon, and one of Cuba's top pianists Aldo Lopez Gavilan.

While his 1990 solo album Southern Cross was an album of Latin music, Manzanera started in 1999 a series of solo productions that reflect his past achievements in a modern context. Many musicians from past times turn up again on the recordings, like Brian Eno, Andy Mackay, Robert Wyatt, Bill MacCormick and many others. On The Sound of Blue even a couple of former musical themes turn up reworked. These albums also feature Phil as lead vocalist.

In 2015, he directed the final concert of the Notte della Taranta Festival, in Salento (Italy.)

Other efforts
 Phil Manzanera co-produced David Gilmour's album On an Island. Manzanera also played rhythm guitar on Gilmour's world tour to support the album in 2006 and appears in Gilmour's concert films Remember That Night and Live in Gdańsk.
 Manzanera appears briefly playing a guitar solo in Red Dwarf series 6 episode "Psirens". Only his hands appeared playing the guitar, and his credit on the IMDb lists his role as "Hands of Psiren Lister". On screen he is credited as "the hands of Phil Manzanera".
 He wrote and presented a series of 14 one-hour radio programmes for station Planet Rock entitled The A-Z of Great Guitarists.

Guitars and sound
Manzanera has played a variety of instruments throughout his career, but he is best known for his "signature" guitar, a 1964 'Cardinal Red' Gibson Firebird VII, with gold-plated pick-ups and tuners. This guitar became widely known to fans after Manzanera posed with it during the photo session that produced the inner gatefold photo for Roxy Music's second album For Your Pleasure in 1972, and he has used it regularly throughout his career. Manzanera also frequently uses two custom-made Gibson Les Paul guitars, one of which (picture above) features a mother of pearl inlay in the shape of an iguana. On tour and in the studio, Manzanera also regularly plays Fender Stratocasters, a Fender Telecaster, and Blade guitars. On the evidence of the cover photographs for the 801 Live album, he also played a Yamaha SG-2000 guitar (as used by Carlos Santana) during the 801 period.

Beginning in the early days of Roxy Music, Manzanera's guitar sound was often heavily treated using various electronic devices and techniques, including processing the output of his guitar through Eno's synthesizers, both in the studio and on stage. This allowed him to create a wide range of sounds and textures, many of which are not immediately identifiable as having been produced by an electric guitar. On his solo album Primitive Guitars, all the sounds on the album except the drum machine and the bass played by John Wetton (on one track) were produced by Manzanera's guitars.

Personal life
In 1977, Manzanera purchased St. Anne's Court, in Chertsey, consisting of a coach house, which Manzanera converted into a recording studio and a main house, designed in 1936 by the architect Sir Raymond McGrath. The gardens were created by Christopher Tunnard.

The recording studio was used to record Manzanera's solo albums and Roxy Music's Flesh & Blood and Avalon. The main house later featured in the television production Poirot.

Manzanera sold the property to 3Dlabs founder, Osman Kent, in 1997.

Awards and honours 
Asteroid 72801 Manzanera, discovered by Marc Buie at Kitt Peak National Observatory in 2001, was named in his honour. The official  was published by the Minor Planet Center on 18 May 2019.

Selected discography

Solo

Studio albums 
Diamond Head (1975)
K-Scope (1978)
Primitive Guitars (1982)
Wetton/Manzanera (with John Wetton) (1987)
Crack The Whip (with Andy Mackay) (1988)
Up in Smoke (with Andy Mackay) (1989)
Mato Grosso (with Sergio Dias) (1990)
Southern Cross (1990)
Boleros Hoy (with Tania Libertad) (1991)
Vozero (1999)
6PM (2004)
50 Minutes Later (2005)
Firebird V11 (2008)
The Sound of Blue (2015)
Caught by the Heart (2021)

EPs 
 Caught by the Heart (with Tim Finn) (2021)

Live albums 
Live at the Karl Marx, Havana (with Grupo Moncada) (1992)
Live at the Curious Arts Festival (2016)

Compilations 
Guitarissimo 75–82 (1986)
Manzanera & Mackay (1991)
Rare One (rarities 1975–1991) (2000)
Wetton Manzanera (self-titled limited edition vinyl) (2020)
Round in Circles/ Talk to Me (singles) (limited edition vinyl) (2020)

Roxy Music

Studio albums 
 Roxy Music (1972)
 For Your Pleasure (1973)
 Stranded (1973)
 Country Life (1974)
 Siren (1975)
 Manifesto (1979)
 Flesh and Blood (1980)
 Avalon (1982)

Quiet Sun 
 Mainstream (1975)

801

Studio album 
 Listen Now (1977)

Live albums 
801 Live (1976)
Live at Manchester University (1977)
801 Latino (2001)
Live at Hull 1977 (2001)

The Explorers

Studio album 
 The Explorers (1985)

Live album 
 Live at the Palace (1997)

Nowomowa 
 The Wasted Lands (1988)

Corroncho 
 Corroncho (2010)
 Corroncho 2 (2017)

Session work 
The End... (Nico) (1974)
Freeze Frame (Godley & Creme) (1979)
Neuromantic (Yukihiro Takahashi) (1981)
Men Singing (Henry Fool) (2013)
Half Life (The Eden House) (2013)
Rattle That Lock (David Gilmour) (2015)
"Our Path to Freedom" (Radz) (2023)

As producer 
 John Cale: Fear (1974)
 Split Enz: Second Thoughts (1976)
 Heroes del Silencio: "Senderos de Traición" (1990)
 Tania Libertad: "Boleros Hoy" (1991)
 Nina Hagen: Revolution Ballroom (1993)
 Heroes del Silencio: "El Espíritu del Vino" (1993)
 Os Paralamas do Sucesso: Severino (1994)
 Fito Páez: Circo Beat (1994)
 Antonio Vega: Océano de Sol (1994)
 Aterciopelados: La Pipa de la Paz (1996)
 Robi Draco Rosa: "Vagabundo" (1996)
 Enrique Bunbury: "Radical Sonora" (1997)
 Monica Naranjo: "Minage" (2000)
 David Gilmour: On an Island (2006)
 Enrique Bunbury: "Hellville deluxe" (2008)
 The Hall Effect: The Hall Effect (2010)
 Pink Floyd: The Endless River (2014)
 David Gilmour: Rattle That Lock (2015)

References

External links 

 manzanera.com: Phil Manzanera's home page, Expression Records and the Roxy Music Archive
 Viva Roxy Music Site about Manzanera's work with Roxy Music and his solo work, collaborations and sessions
 Phil Manzanera discussed his life and career on Meet The Writers, Monocle 24 with Georgina Godwin

1951 births
Living people
Roxy Music members
English rock guitarists
English record producers
Island Records artists
Polydor Records artists
E.G. Records artists
People educated at Dulwich College
English people of Colombian descent
British expatriates in Colombia
Lead guitarists
English songwriters
Rhythm guitarists
Glam rock musicians
Quiet Sun members
801 (band) members